Ignatius Gronkowski (March 28, 1897 – September 1981) was an American professional cyclist, who represented the United States at the 1924 Summer Olympics in Paris.

He held five world records for the 1/2-, 3/4-, 1.5-, and 2-mile distances. His great-grandsons include former NFL players  Rob, Dan, Chris and Glenn Gronkowski.

References

1897 births
1981 deaths
American male cyclists
American people of Polish descent
Olympic cyclists of the United States
Cyclists at the 1924 Summer Olympics
Sportspeople from Buffalo, New York
Gronkowski family